The BMW M2B15 was BMW's first flat-twin engine. Manufactured from 1920 to 1923, the M2B15 was intended to be a portable industrial engine, but it was used by several German motorcycle manufacturers to power their motorcycles.  

In 1920, BMW engineer Max Friz reverse-engineered the engine of foreman Martin Stolle's 1914 Douglas motorcycle and developed a similar 500 cc side-valve flat engine from it. This was referred to internally as the Type M2B15 and offered for sale officially as the "Bayern Motor". The engine was tried out by various motorcycle manufacturers. Starting in 1920, Victoria of Nuremberg used the engine in their KR 1 motorcycle, and other manufacturers such as SMW and Bison also fitted it.

Bayerische Flugzeugwerke used the M2B15 engine in their Helios motorcycle.  BMW inherited the Helios when it was merged with BFW in 1922.

References

M2B15
Motorcycle engines
Boxer engines